Enzo Fiermonte (17 July 1908 – 22 March 1993), sometimes credited as William Bird, was an Italian actor and boxer.

Early life
Vincenzo "Enzo" Fiermonte was born on 17 July 1908 in Casamassima, a rural village near Bari, in southern Italy to Donato and Lucrezia Fiermonte.

Career
From 1925 to 1934, he was a professional boxer, with a lifetime record of 47 wins (11 by knockout), 17 losses (10 by knockout), and 2 draws. On June 22, 1943, he announced his permanent retirement from boxing.

In 1937, he entered his Maserati in the Vanderbilt Cup auto race in Westbury, New York, but was not allowed to participate because he had no formal auto racing experience.

Acting career

In 1940, he starred as a boxer in Dino De Laurentiis' first film,  L'ultimo Combattimento (The Last Fight), directed by Pietro Ballerini.  Between the 1940s and the 1980s, he had acting roles in at least 116 films.

Personal life
Fiermonte was married to Tosca Manetti. In June 1933, Fiermonte's wife announced that he was seeking a divorce so he could wed Madeleine Talmage Force (1893–1940), the former wife of John Jacob Astor IV, who died aboard the RMS Titanic.

Fiermonte married Madeleine on 27 November 1933 in New York City, shortly after her divorce from her second husband, William Dick, on 21 July 1933.  In 1935, they bought the former Dixie Plantation, a 600-acre estate in Charleston, South Carolina overlooking the Stono River.

They were divorced on 11 June 1938. He was only four years older than his stepson, John Jacob Astor VI, during the marriage. In 1944, he allegedly got engaged in Italy to Princess , but they never married.

Fiermonte died in March 1993 in Mentana, Italy.

Selected filmography

 L'ultimo combattimento (1941) - Bruno Dal Monte
 Beatrice Cenci (1941) - Olimpio Calvetti
 Il chiromante (1941) - Paolo
 Il mercante di schiave (1942) - Alì
 The Adventures of Fra Diavolo (1942) - Michele Pezza / Fra' Diavolo
 Spie fra le eliche (1943) - L'ispettore Enzo Massa
 The Champion (1943) - Massimo
 The Last Wagon (1943) - Roberto Pinelli, l'autista
 Finalmente sì (1944) - Il conte Alberto
 Nessuno torna indietro (1945) - Mario Ponte
 L'abito nero da sposa (1945) - Giuliano de Medici
 Non canto più (1945) - Il tenore Guido Revi
 Tehran (1946)
 Uno tra la folla (1946) - Marco
 L'atleta di cristallo (1946) - Franco Adami - pugile
 Buried Alive (1949) - Bruno
 Buffalo Bill a Roma (1949) - Buffalo Bill
 Son of d'Artagnan (1950) - Visconte di Langlass
 Hawk of the Nile (1950) - Sceicco Rachid
 The Two Sisters (1950) - Barone Enrico
 Quo Vadis (1951) - Mounted Captain (uncredited)
 O.K. Nerone (1951) - Gladiator
 The Small Miracle (1951) - Sergeant of Swiss Guards
 The Mistress of Treves (1952) - Il barone Drago
 When in Rome (1952) - Harbor Policeman (uncredited)
 Lieutenant Giorgio (1952) - Antonio Esposito (uncredited)
 The Shameless Sex (1952)
 Milady and the Musketeers (1952)
 I Piombi di Venezia (1953)
 It Was She Who Wanted It! (1953) - Fiermonte
 Lasciateci in pace (1953)
 I misteri della giungla nera (1954) - Sergeant Claridge
 Black Devils of Kali (1954) - Sgt. Claridge
 Cose da pazzi (1954) - Paolo
 The Last Race (1954) - Filippo
 Romeo and Juliet (1954) - Tybalt
 Angela (1954) - Sgt. Collins
 Loves of Three Queens (1954) - (Segment: The Face That Launched a Thousand Ships) (uncredited)
 I cavalieri della regina (1954) - Prince of Condé
 Barrier of the Law (1954)
 Sultana Safiyè (1955)
 Altair (1956)
 The Knight of the Black Sword (1956) - Mario
 The King's Musketeers (1957) - Brissac
 La spada imbattibile (1957) - Brissac
 The Goddess of Love (1957)
 Amarti è il mio destino (1957) - Juan
 Il cocco di mamma (1958) - Michele, Vasco's father
 Il cielo brucia (1958)
 The Naked Maja (1958) - Navarra (uncredited)
 Herod the Great (1959)
 Head of a Tyrant (1959)
 Poveri milionari (1959) - Vittorio, Alice's Chauffeur (uncredited)
 Ben-Hur (1959) - Galley Officer (uncredited)
 Hannibal (1959) - Announcer in Senate
 The Cossacks (1960) - Shamil's Confident
 Conspiracy of Hearts (1960) - Italian Soldier #2
 Rocco and His Brothers (1960) - Boxer
 Pirates of the Coast (1960) - Mascella
 The Pharaohs' Woman (1960)
 The Bacchantes (1961) - Policrates (uncredited)
 Revolt of the Mercenaries (1961) - Cizzania
 Damon and Pythias (1962)
 The Slave (1962) - Gulbar - slave wrestling Randus
 Eva (1962) - Enzo
 Sodom and Gomorrah (1962) - Eber
 The Avenger (1962) - Acate
 Catherine of Russia (1963) - general Munic
 Sandokan the Great (1963) - Sergente Mitchell
 Temple of the White Elephant (1964) - Sgt. Major (uncredited)
 Messalina vs. the Son of Hercules (1964)
 The Lion of Thebes (1964) - Ufficiale di Tutmès
 The Triumph of Hercules (1964) - Reto
 The Two Gladiators (1964) - Gen. Ottavio Cratico
 The Secret Invasion (1964) - Gen. Quadri
 Triumph of the Ten Gladiators (1964) - Rizio
 Spartacus and the Ten Gladiators (1964) - Gladiator Rizio
 Kidnapped to Mystery Island (1964)
 I due toreri (1964) - Capitano Nave
 I predoni del Sahara (1965) - James Stanton
 Wild, Wild Planet (1966) - General Fowler
 War of the Planets (1966) - Gen. Halstead
 War Between the Planets (1966) - Gen. Norton
 After the Fox (1966) - Raymond
 The Ugly Ones (1966) - Novak
 Grand Prix (1966) - Guido
 Snow Devils (1967) - General Norton
 Halleluja for Django (1967) - Sheriff Martin Cooney
 Fantabulous Inc. (1967) - General Van Pelt
 A Long Ride from Hell (1968) - Baldy Morris
 Beyond the Law (1968) - Sheriff John Ferguson
 A Minute to Pray, a Second to Die (1968) - Dr. Chase
 A Black Veil for Lisa (1968) - Siegert
 The Magnificent Tony Carrera (1968) - Arnaldo
 Candy (1968) - Al Pappone
 I quattro del pater noster (1969)
 Camille 2000 (1969) - Gambler
 The Forgotten Pistolero (1969) - Friar (uncredited)
 Boot Hill (1969) - Sharp
 Chuck Moll (1970) - Sheriff
 L'asino d'oro: processo per fatti strani contro Lucius Apuleius cittadino romano (1970) - Proconsul
 Strogoff (1970) - Colonel with general Dubelt
 Defeat of the Mafia (1970) - Count Torreguardia
 The Tigers of Mompracem (1970) - Sergeant
 La califfa (1970) - L'operaio sindacalista
 Les Aveux les plus doux (1971)
 Vengeance Is a Dish Served Cold (1971) - George Bridger
 Scipio the African (1971) - senatore Quinto
 Trinity Is Still My Name (1971) - Perla's Father
 My Dear Killer (1972) - Jib crane owner
 Lo chiamavano Verità (1972)
 Man of the East (1972) - Frank Olsen
 The Mechanic (1972) - The Mark
 Those Dirty Dogs (1973) - Doctor Adams
 Dagli archivi della polizia criminale (1973) - Inspector Vernon
 Anche gli angeli tirano di destro (1974) - Joe Bendaggio (uncredited)
 The Beast (1974) - Matteo Zaghi
 Mannaja (1977) - Government Agent
 A Spiral of Mist (1977) - Mr. Marinoni
 California (1977) - Father of northern soldier
 Il prefetto di ferro (1977)
 6000 km di paura (1978)
 The Iron Commissioner (1978) - Engineer
 Life Is Beautiful (1979) - Zhozo (final film role)

References

External links

1908 births
1993 deaths
Italian male film actors
Male Spaghetti Western actors
20th-century Italian male actors